Brasópolis is a municipality in Minas Gerais, Brazil. Previously called São Caetano da Vargem Grande, it was renamed after its most famous son, Venceslau Brás, ninth President of the Republic, although he was born in neighbouring Itajubá.

The municipality contains part of the  Fernão Dias Environmental Protection Area, created in 1997.

References

Municipalities in Minas Gerais